Aleksandr Igorevich Bondar (born 25 October 1993) is a Ukrainian-born Russian diver.

Career
He competed for Ukraine at the 2012 Summer Olympics in the men's synchronized 10 metre platform.

Bondar moved to Russia at the end of 2014 to be closer to relatives and his Russian girlfriend, Yekaterina Fedorchenko. He and Fedorchenko married in January 2015. In October 2015, he became a Russian citizen.

References

External links

Ukrainian male divers
1993 births
Sportspeople from Luhansk
Living people
Olympic divers of Ukraine
Divers at the 2012 Summer Olympics
Divers at the 2020 Summer Olympics
Divers at the 2010 Summer Youth Olympics
Ukrainian emigrants to Russia
Russian people of Ukrainian descent
Naturalised citizens of Russia
Medalists at the 2020 Summer Olympics
Olympic medalists in diving
Russian male divers
World Aquatics Championships medalists in diving
Olympic bronze medalists for the Russian Olympic Committee athletes
Olympic divers of Russia